Aliabad (also Romanized as ‘Alīābād) is a village in Misheh Pareh Rural District, in the Central District of Kaleybar County, East Azerbaijan Province, Iran. At the 2006 census, its population was 41, in 9 families.

Situation
The online edition of the Dehkhoda Dictionary, quoting Iranian Army files, reports a population of 173 people in late 1940s. According to a more recent statistics the population is 35 people in 16 families.

There is a hazelnut forest on the village territory, along the paved road connecting Aghuyeh and Oskelu villages. In addition, a resting area has been built near the village on the Mikandi valley. As a result, Aliabad is one of the most beautiful areas of Arasbaran region.

The grasslands on the village mountains are the summer quarter of Mohammad Khanlu tribe.

References 

Populated places in Kaleybar County
Kurdish settlements in East Azerbaijan Province